Glinje is a small settlement in the Municipality of Braslovče in northern Slovenia. The area is part of the traditional region of Styria. The municipality is now included in the Savinja Statistical Region.

References

External links
Glinje on Geopedia

Populated places in the Municipality of Braslovče